Julia Gorin is an American conservative writer, journalist, humorist, and political commentator.

Life
Born into a Jewish family in the Soviet Union, Gorin immigrated as a toddler to the United States in 1976. Her father was a violinist with the Baltimore Symphony Orchestra. She is a 1990 graduate of the Randallstown High School in Randallstown, Maryland.

Gorin wrote the satirical 2008 book, Clintonisms: The Amusing, Confusing, and Even Suspect Musing, of Billary.

Writings and affiliations
Gorin has contributed articles to Jewish World Review, National Review, The Wall Street Journal, FrontPage Magazine, Jihad Watch, The Huffington Post, The American Thinker, The Christian Science Monitor, WorldNetDaily and FoxNews.com. 

Gorin is an unpaid member of the Advisory Board of the American Council for Kosovo, which lobbies on behalf of the Serbian National Council of Kosovo and Metohija. She frequently writes about the former Yugoslavia, especially Kosovo and is an opponent of its independence.

After the January 6, 2021 attacks on the US Capitol, Gorin wrote an OpEd in the Washington Times comparing the Congressional response to that of post-invasion Kosovo.

References

External links
Julia Gorin official website
Articles written by her on Huffington Post
Articles written by her on Jewish World Review and Political Mavens
Her blog, "Republican Riot"

Living people
American bloggers
American columnists
American humorists
American people of Russian-Jewish descent
American political commentators
American political writers
American social commentators
American critics of Islam
Jewish American writers
Jewish women writers
National Review people
Soviet emigrants to the United States
Soviet Jews
Writers on the Middle East
Year of birth missing (living people)
21st-century American non-fiction writers
Women humorists
American women columnists
American women bloggers
21st-century American women writers
21st-century American Jews
1972 births